Northside Historic District is a national historic district located at Elizabeth City, Pasquotank County, North Carolina. The district encompasses 398 contributing buildings in a predominantly residential section of Elizabeth City.  The district developed from the mid-19th to mid-20th century, and includes representative examples of Greek Revival, Queen Anne, Colonial Revival, Bungalow / American Craftsman, and Classical Revival style architecture. Notable contributing buildings include the John S. Burgess House (c. 1847), Scott-Culpepper House (c. 1845), Luther C. Lassiter House (1908-1913), William F. Williams House (1908-1914), Miles Pritchard House (c. 1909), Mack N. Sawyer House (1895), the Godfrey-Foreman House (c. 1893), Dr. Walter W. Sawyer House (1915), City Road United Methodist Church (1900-1902), Blackwell Memorial Baptist Church (1902), former Elizabeth City High School (1923), and S. L. Sheep School (1940).

It was listed on the National Register of Historic Places in 1994.

References

Historic districts on the National Register of Historic Places in North Carolina
Greek Revival architecture in North Carolina
Neoclassical architecture in North Carolina
Queen Anne architecture in North Carolina
Colonial Revival architecture in North Carolina
Buildings and structures in Pasquotank County, North Carolina
National Register of Historic Places in Pasquotank County, North Carolina